KMAN (1350 AM) is a radio station broadcasting a News Talk format. Licensed to Manhattan, Kansas, United States, the station serves the Salina-Manhattan area. The station is currently owned by Manhattan Broadcasting Co. and features programing from CBS News Radio, ESPN Radio, Compass Media Networks, Premiere Networks, and Westwood One.

References

External links

News and talk radio stations in the United States
MAN